Ramsheh (also Romanized as Rāmsheh and Rāmshah; also known as Rūm Shāh) is a village in Ramsheh Rural District, Jarqavieh Olya District, Isfahan County, Isfahan Province, Iran. At the 2006 census, its population was 2,579, in 770 families.

References 

Populated places in Isfahan County